Rufus Henry Ingram (1834–unknown) was a bushwhacker who led Captain Ingram's Partisan Rangers that operated in California in 1864.

Background
In 1863, Rufus Henry Ingram met George Baker from San Jose, California, who had just come east to join the Confederate Army.  Baker complained because the secessionists in California had no experienced leaders. Ingram claimed to have been with Quantrill's Raiders during the Lawrence Massacre and became interested in going back with Baker to recruit soldiers for the Southern cause. 

In early 1864, Rufus Henry Ingram arrived in Santa Clara County with a Confederate commission as captain and with a former undersheriff of Monterey County, Tom Poole, organized about fifty local Knights of the Golden Circle and commanded them in what became known as Captain Ingram's Partisan Rangers. Finding difficulty in raising funds to purchase supplies for his unit, Ingram first planned a raid on San Jose to rob its banks and stores in the manner of Quantrill's raid on Lawrence. A quarrel within the band, however, led to the exposure of the plan to the local sheriff and it was abandoned.   

Soon after, Ingram decided to rob shipments of silver from the Comstock Lode to Sacramento. On June 30, Ingram, along with a small detachment, robbed two stagecoaches eleven miles east of Placerville of their gold and silver, leaving a letter explaining they were not bandits but carrying out a military operation to raise funds for the Confederacy. During the pursuit of his fleeing band, the posse had a gunfight with two lawmen at the Somerset House. One of the posse was killed, while Poole was wounded and left to be captured. After a two-day chase the Placerville posse lost their trail and they got to Santa Clara County a week later. Tom Poole gave a complete confession, the bullion was recovered and he exposed his companions' identities. Regardless, they evaded the search for them in Santa Clara County.

Disappearance
On July 15, an attempt by Ingram to rob the New Almaden Quicksilver Mine payroll failed, ending in a shootout with the posse of Santa Clara County Sheriff John Hicks Adams a mile and a half outside San Jose on the Almaden road. Two of Ingram's men were killed, while one of his men was wounded. The sheriff and his deputy were also wounded in the shootout. Ingram fled California for Missouri and was never captured afterwards.

See also
List of fugitives from justice who disappeared

References

1834 births
Bushwhackers
California in the American Civil War
Confederate States Army officers
Fugitives
Gunslingers of the American Old West
Irregular forces of the American Civil War
Outlaws of the American Old West
People from Santa Clara County, California
Year of death missing